Jeffrey Herlings
(born 12 September 1994) is a Dutch professional motocross racer. He has competed in the Motocross World Championships since 2010. Herlings is notable for winning the 2012, 2013, and 2016 MX2 Championships; and the 2018, 2021 MXGP Championships  

Born in Geldrop, the Netherlands, Herlings was a member of the winning Dutch team at the 2019 Motocross des Nations event that included Glenn Coldenhoff and Calvin Vlaanderen. Their victory marked the first Dutch win in the 73-year history of the Motocross des Nations. He competes in the MXGP Motocross World Championship for the Red Bull KTM factory racing team.

Herlings has been the victim of several injuries. During the 2020 FIM Motocross World Championship he won the first round in Faenza reaching 90 victories (on par with Antonio Cairoli), but fell during the training for the second round, a very risky one as he was virtually paralyzed for about 30 minutes before regain the control of his body. In October Herlings decided to not finish the season to recover from his fall in Italy as well as a previous foot injury. In 2021 Herlings missed one round after Kawasaki rider Ivo Monticelli landed his bike on his shoulder, fracturing his scapula but not preventing his race victory or stopping him from winning the 2021 MXGP World Championship. Herlings sat out the entire 2022 after suffering a foot injury in pre season training.

Results 

2002 Dutch Champion 65cc Amateur federation.
2003 Dutch Champion 65cc Amateur federation
2004 Dutch Champion 65cc KNMV
2004 3rd European Championship 65cc
2005 Dutch Champion 85cc Small wheels KNMV 
2006 4th Dutch Open Championship 85cc Big Wheels
2006 2nd International Youth weekend at Heerde
2007 2nd Dutch Championship 85cc Big Wheels
2007 4th European Championship 85cc Big Wheels
2007 6th World Championship 85cc Big Wheels
2008 Dutch Champion 85cc
2008 European Champion 85cc
2008 World Champion 85cc
2008 German Champion 85cc
2009 2nd European Championship MX2
2009 3rd Dutch Open Championship MX2
2010 6th World Championship MX2 (2 GP wins, 6 podiums)
2010 2nd Dutch Open Championship MX2
2011 2nd World Championship MX2 (5 GP wins, 11 podiums)
2011 Dutch Open Champion MX2
2012 World Champion MX2 (9 GP wins, 13 podiums)
2012 Dutch Open Champion MX2
2013 World Champion MX2 (15 GP wins, 15 podiums)
2013 Dutch Open Champion MX2
2014 2nd World Championship MX2 (12 GP wins, 12 podiums)
2014 4th Dutch Open Championship MX2
2015 7th World Championship MX2 (4 GP wins, 8 podiums)
2016 World Champion MX2 (14 GP wins, 15 podiums)
2017 2nd World Championship MXGP (6 GP wins, 11 podiums)
2017 AMA Motocross Championship 450 class (2 races, 2 wins)
2018 World Champion MXGP (17 GP wins, 19 podiums)
2019 19th World Championship MXGP (2 GP wins, 2 podiums)
2019 MxoN Champions Team Netherlands
2021 World Champion MXGP (9 GP wins)

Personal life 
On 13 January 2019, Herlings was dubbed a Knight in the Order of Orange-Nassau at the KNMV Motorsports Gala.

References

External links
Jeffrey Herlings at MXGP

1994 births
Living people
People from Geldrop
Sportspeople from North Brabant
Dutch motocross riders
Knights of the Order of Orange-Nassau
21st-century Dutch people